Robert Benjamin Hayes (born May 13, 1876) was an African American educator and administrator in the United States. He headed Philander Smith College's science department and served as the president of George R. Smith College.

He was born in Navasota, Texas to Lucius and Laura, née Clayton, Hayes. He studied at schools in Chetopa, Kansas and Guthrie, Oklahoma before graduating from Baker University in Baldwin, Kansas.

References

1876 births
Year of death missing
Philander Smith College faculty